Drexciya is a Ghanaian 2010 short documentary film directed and produced by Akosua Adoma Owusu in association with California Institute of the Arts (CalArts). The film had its theatrical premiere at the 2011 International Film Festival Rotterdam and participated in Video Studio: Changing Same at the Studio Museum in Harlem, New York.

Synopsis 
Drexciya portrays an abandoned public swimming facility located in Accra, Ghana set on the Riviera. The Riviera at one time was an upscale development, consisting of luxury high-rises and five star hotels. Since the 1970s, the Riviera has fallen into a disheveled state. This short documentary was inspired by afro-futurist myths propagated by the underground Detroit-based band Drexciya. They suggest that Drexciya is a mythical underwater subcontinent populated by the unborn children of African women thrown overboard during the Trans-Atlantic slave trade. These children have adapted and evolved to breathe underwater.

Screenings 
 9th International Festival Signes de Nuit, Paris 2011
 IndieLisboa 2011
 Viennale 2011
 30th Festival Internacional de Cine de Huesca 2011
 Festival del cinema africano, d'Asia e America Latina di Milano 2011
 Rencontres Internationales Paris/Berlin/Madrid 2011
 Toronto International Film Festival, 2012
 OkayAfrica - The Future Weird: Black Atlantis, New York 2013, USA
 Tabakalera, 2015 Spain
 Institute of Contemporary Art, Philadelphia, 2015 USA
 Detroit Institute of Arts, 2016, USA
 Posthuman Complicities at mumok, 2017 Vienna, Austria
 Labocine, 2018
 20th FestCurtasBH, 2018 Brasil

Awards 
 Best Experimental Film - Guanajuato International Film Festival 2011
 Mención Especial al Cortometraje, 8th African Film Festival, Tarifa 2011
 Top 10 African films of 2011
 Juror's Citation Prize - Black Maria Film & Video Festival 2011
 Camera in the Sun

References

External links 

Obibini Pictures LLC
Grasshopper Film

2010 films
2010 short documentary films
Ghanaian documentary films
Ghanaian short films